Sheikh Hazza bin Zayed bin Sultan Al Nahyan (born 2 June 1965) is the younger brother of the President of the United Arab Emirates Sheikh Mohamed bin Zayed Al Nahyan, former National Security Advisor of the UAE and Deputy Chairman of Abu Dhabi Executive Council.

Early life
He is the fifth son of Sheikh Zayed bin Sultan Al Nahyan, the founder and first President of the United Arab Emirates. His mother is Sheikha Fatima bint Mubarak Al Ketbi and he has five full-brothers: Mohammed, Hamdan, Tahnoun, Mansour, and Abdullah.

Career
Appointed by the Federal Decree No. (91) of 2006 issued by His Highness the Head of State for National Security Advisor.
Vice President of the Executive Council of Abu Dhabi Emirate.
Chairman of the Emirates Identity Authority.
Al Ain Club
Chairman of Board of Directors (past)
Vice-president of the executive board and of the honorary board (current)
Abu Dhabi Sports Council, chairman
Abu Dhabi Combat Club, president
In 2006, he was elected as Chairman of First Gulf Bank. He succeeded the chairman position from Sheikh Mansour bin Zayed Al Nahyan, his other brother. On 12 December 2010, he was appointed as a member of Executive Council of Abu Dhabi.

Controversies

Pandora Papers
The October 2021 leak of more than 11.9 million documents by the International Consortium of Investigative Journalists (ICIJ) mentioned Sheikh Hazza as one of the Emirati royals with offshore holdings. The former national security adviser of the UAE reportedly owned the H Hotel office tower at 1 Sheikh Zayed Road, which gave space to at least four companies that provided offshore clients with financial or company formation services. Amongst these firms was SFM Corporate Services that had its office in the building until 2017. The ICIJ report said that SFM provided its services to owners of at least 2,977 firms in the UAE, the British Virgin Islands and other offshore financial centres. It was also revealed that Sheikh Hazza has his own offshore companies outside the UAE. In 2016, an Emirati law firm, Hadef & Partners assisted Shiekh Hazza to incorporate a UAE Company named Loomington Investments Ltd. The report revealed that two other companies with same name in the British Virgin Islands and Seychelles were owned by Sheikh Hazza.

Personal life

His wife is Sheikha Mozah bint Mohammed bin Butti Al Hamed, sister of Abdulla bin Mohammed bin Butti Al Hamed, and they have five children:
Sheikha Fatima bint Hazza bin Zayed Al Nahyan.
Sheikha Salama bint Hazza bin Zayed Al Nahyan.
Sheikh Zayed bin Hazza bin Zayed Al Nahyan (born 1995).
Sheikha Meera bint Hazza bin Zayed Al Nahyan. She married Sheikh Zayed bin Mansour bin Zayed Al Nahyan on May 5, 2022.
Sheikh Mohammed bin Hazza bin Zayed Al Nahyan (born 2002).

Ancestry

Honours
 Algeria: Order of the Athir (17 October 2007)

See also
Hazza Bin Zayed Stadium

References

1965 births
Living people
Hazza
Emirati bankers
Children of presidents of the United Arab Emirates
People named in the Pandora Papers
Sons of monarchs